Horsepen Creek is a  long tributary to the Little Nottoway River in the United States state of Virginia. Located in the south-central part of the state, it is part of the larger Chowan-Albemarle drainage. The watershed is 66% forested and 32% agricultural with the rest of land as other uses.

Course
Horsepen Creek rises about 0.1 miles east of Winnie, Virginia on the Nottoway River divide in Nottoway County.  The creek then flows southeast and east through Lake Amtoco to meet the Little Nottoway River about 2 miles southwest of Blackstone.

Watershed
Horsepen Creek drains  of area, receives about 45.6 in/year of precipitation, has a topographic wetness index of 404.31 and is about 76% forested.

See also
List of rivers of Virginia

References

Additional Images

Rivers of Virginia
Tributaries of Albemarle Sound
Rivers of Nottoway County, Virginia